Karaga is one of the constituencies represented in the Parliament of Ghana. It elects one Member of Parliament (MP) by the first past the post system of election. Karaga is located in the Karaga district of the Northern Region of Ghana.

History
This was one of the many constituencies created prior to the 2004 presidential and parliamentary elections.

Boundaries
The seat is located entirely within the Karaga district of the Northern Region of Ghana.

Members of Parliament

Elections

See also
List of Ghana Parliament constituencies

References 

Parliamentary constituencies in the Northern Region (Ghana)